Lackland Air Force Base   is a United States Air Force (USAF) base located in Bexar County, Texas. The base is under the jurisdiction of the 802d Mission Support Group, Air Education and Training Command (AETC) and an enclave of the city of San Antonio. It is the only site for USAF and United States Space Force enlisted Basic Military Training (BMT).

Lackland AFB is part of Joint Base San Antonio (JBSA), an amalgamation of Fort Sam Houston, Randolph AFB and Lackland AFB, which were merged on 1 October 2010. JBSA was established in accordance with congressional legislation implementing the recommendations of the 2005 Base Realignment and Closure Commission. The legislation ordered the consolidation of the three facilities which were adjoining, but separate military installations, into a single joint base – one of 12 joint bases formed in the United States as a result of the law.

Units
 502nd Installation Support Group
 A unit of the JBSA 502nd Air Base Wing, the 502nd ISG is the focal point for all base activities, serving and supporting the 37th and 737th Training Groups and all of its mission partners as well as the more than 24,000 retirees living in the local area.
 37th Training Wing
 37th Training Group
 Provides professional, military and technical training in the knowledge and skills needed for graduates to perform their jobs worldwide. Joint service training for USAF, U.S. Army, U.S. Navy and U.S. Marine Corps personnel is provided in numerous courses, such as the military working dog program and security and law enforcement
 737th Training Group
 Provides Basic Military Training for all enlisted people entering the USAF, Air Force Reserve and Air National Guard, earning Lackland the nickname, "Gateway to the Air Force." The group was the center of the United States Air Force Basic Training scandal, 2012. Since 2020, it has also provided basic training for enlisted recruits to the United States Space Force.
 Inter-American Air Forces Academy
 Fostering enduring Inter-American engagement through education and training. Teaches 37 technical courses, in Spanish and in English, to students from more than 22 countries every year.
 Defense Language Institute
 Primary mission was to teach English to Allied pilot candidates. In 1966, its mission expanded to include other career fields, and the school moved under the Department of Defense with the U.S. Army as the executive agent.
 Sixteenth Air Force
 Operates, maintains and defends the USAF information networks and directs mission critical cyber terrain, provides multisource intelligence, surveillance, and reconnaissance products, and is the Service Cryptologic Component responsible to the National Security Agency's Central Security Service for Air Force matters involving the conduct of cryptologic activities.
 624th Operations Center
 Interfaces with theater and functional Air Operations Centers to establish, plan, direct, coordinate, assess, and command & control cyber operations in support of USAF and Joint warfighting requirements.

Lackland AFB hosts a collection of vintage military aircraft on static display on its parade grounds, including a Boeing B-52 Stratofortress, McDonnell Douglas F-4 Phantom II, Lockheed SR-71 Blackbird, B-29 Superfortress, C-121 Constellation, Boeing B-17 Flying Fortress and a B-25 Mitchell.

Training mission
Lackland Air Force Base is home to the 37th Training Wing (37 TRW) which operates a variety of training squadrons. Within the 37th TRW is the 37th Training Group (37 TRG) which oversees the 5 technical training schools on the base, and the 737 TRG which oversees the Basic Military Training squadrons.

Basic training (enlisted)

Lackland is best known for its role in being the sole location for U.S. Air Force enlisted Basic Military Training (BMT) for the active duty Regular Air Force, Air Force Reserve and Air National Guard. BMT is organized into nine basic training squadrons, each with their own training site on the base. Each squadron is equipped with either a dining facility or a medical clinic. Some BMT squadrons share dining facilities if they are located close enough together and the same is true for medical clinics. Each squadron also has a specific exercise area where basic trainees conduct physical readiness training (PRT). Also, AFOSI anti-terrorism teams are trained here.

In October 2008 the BMT was expanded an extra two weeks to implement more air base defense training as well as other rudimentary skills. The BMT course of training is at  weeks.

Officer training
Prior to 22 September 1993, Lackland AFB's Medina Annex was also home to Air Force Officer Training School (OTS), one of three USAF officer accession and commissioning sources in addition to the U.S. Air Force Academy and Air Force ROTC. On 25 September 1993, OTS permanently relocated to Maxwell AFB, Alabama.

Technical training
Lackland, like many other Air Education and Training Command (AETC) bases, trains enlisted airmen out of basic training in a specific specialty via various "tech schools."  Lackland currently has six technical training squadrons on base training multiple airmen in various Air Force Specialty Codes (AFSCs).
 The 37th Training Group supports the following five training squadrons and also trains technical training instructors, military training instructors and military training leaders.
 The 341st Training Squadron trains military working dogs and handlers for the entire Department of Defense and several federal agencies.
 The 342nd Training Squadron teaches Pararescuemen, Combat Controllers, Special Operations Weathermen, Tactical Air Control Party members, Survival, Evasion, Resistance and Escape (SERE) Specialists, and a variety of advanced Security Forces courses.
 The 343rd TRS trains airmen to become Security Forces members in a 13-week academy.
 The 344th TRS provides  technical training for more than 10,000 active duty, Reserve, Guard, international and civilian students annually in Career Enlisted Aviator, Vehicle Maintenance, Logistics Readiness Officer, Logistics Plans, Materiel Management, Contracting, Recruiting, Safety, Cryptological, and TEMPEST courses.
 The 345th TRS trains, develops and educates technical training students into skilled graduates in the Services, Air Transportation, Hazardous Material Transportation School (HAZMAT) and Traffic Management Office career fields..

History

World War II
Construction on Lackland Air Force Base began on 15 June 1941, and it was originally part of Kelly Field. One year later, it became an independent organization—the San Antonio Aviation Cadet Center (SAAC). On 8 January 1943, the War Department constituted and activated the 78th Flying Training Wing (Preflight) at San Antonio and assigned it to the United States Army Air Force's Central Flying Training Command. The 78th Wing provided aviation cadets the mechanics and physics of flight and required the cadets to pass courses in mathematics and the hard sciences. Then the cadets were taught to apply their knowledge practically by teaching them aeronautics, deflection shooting, and thinking in three dimensions. Once completed, the graduates were designated as aviation cadets and were sent to one of the primary flight schools for pilot training.

Cold War
On 3 February 1948, the facility was named Lackland AFB after Brigadier General Frank Lackland, who was commissioned into the regular Army after serving in the District of Columbia National Guard. It shared Basic Military Training status temporarily with Sampson AFB during the Korean War and Amarillo AFB during the Vietnam War until Amarillo's closure in 1968.

As a result of the Korean War, training populations at Lackland soared to 28 basic military training squadrons (BMTS) within the 3700th Military Training Wing. Temporary facilities, to include 129 "I dormitories", were hastily erected as a quick fix to replace tents cities housing recruits. In 1955 the number of BMTS was reduced to 16, where it remained for the next two decades.

The Vietnam War buildup necessitated a "split-phase" training from August 1965 to April 1966. This program provided for 22 days at Lackland and 8 days at a technical school, with directed duty assignees receiving the full 30 days at Lackland. When BMT returned to a single phase on 1 April 1966, it was briefly cut back to 24 days from April to July 1966. After that, basic training stabilized at a length of six weeks. This was the same length as the program used by the Army Air Forces when Lackland opened as a basic training base 20 years before. Training requirements also expanded to include teaching English to Allied military members from foreign countries.

No other item in the 1960s compared to the incident that occurred at Lackland in February 1966 with the death of a basic trainee. An airman died of spinal meningitis and while ten other cases were confirmed, no other deaths were reported. Virtually all non-essential activities requiring gatherings of basic trainees were canceled. To control the issue further, a cadre of personnel was assigned to activate the 3330th Basic Military Training School at Amarillo AFB in Amarillo, Texas, in February 1966. As a result of the continuing expansion of the USAF, Amarillo AFB continued to conduct basic training until December 1968.

During the 1960s, more permanent facilities were constructed, including four 1,000-person steel and brick Recruit Housing and Training (RH&T) dormitories built between 1966 and 1970 for basic military training by the Lackland Military Training Center. These state-of-the-art buildings included living space, dining halls, and training areas for four basic training squadrons under one roof. Eventually six full-size dormitories, and two 600-person facilities, were constructed, enabling excess space to be converted to classroom use.

Air Defense Command
In late 1951, Air Defense Command selected Lackland AFB as one of twenty-eight radar stations built as part of the second segment of the permanent radar surveillance network. Prompted by the start of the Korean War, on 11 July 1950, the Secretary of the Air Force asked the Secretary of Defense for approval to expedite construction of the second segment of the permanent network. Receiving the Defense Secretary's approval on 21 July, the Air Force directed the Corps of Engineers to proceed with construction.

On 1 February 1953, the 741st Aircraft Control and Warning Squadron was activated at Lackland (P-75)  with an AN/FPS-3 search radar and an AN/FPS-4 height-finder radar. In 1958 the AN/FPS-4 height-finder radar was replaced by AN/FPS-6 and AN/FPS-6A sets.

By late 1959, Lackland was also performing air-traffic-control duties for the Federal Aviation Administration (FAA). At this time the site hosted an AN/FPS-20A radar. One AN/FPS-6 was retired by 1963. On 31 July 1963, the site was redesignated as NORAD ID Z-75.

In addition to the main facility, Lackland operated an AN/FPS-14 Gap Filler site:
 Schulenburg, TX    (P-75A): 

In 1965, AN/FPS-20A was upgraded to an AN/FPS-91A radar, then in 1969 it was modified to an AN/FPS-66A. The 741st Aircraft Control and Warning Squadron was inactivated in December 1969, and the FAA assumed control of the radar site.

In September 1972, the Houston-based 630th Radar Squadron sent a detachment (OL-D) to this FAA-operated site to set up an AN/FPS-6 height-finder radar to join the AN/FPS-66A search radar already in place  (Z-241). The Air Force ceased using the Lackland AFB radar site on 30 September 1976.

Today, the Lackland ADC site has been taken over by the FAA (also known as 'San Antonio') and remains in operation. This now-FAA long-range radar site is now data-tied into the Joint Surveillance System. The site still operates the AN/FPS-66A search radar.

Post–Cold War era
From the end of the Cold War, Base Realignment and Closure (BRAC) actions in the 1990s relocated several specialized training programs at Lackland. This included Air Education and Training Command's relocation of Air Force Officer Training School (OTS) from Lackland to Maxwell AFB in Montgomery, Alabama.

Lackland gained a flying mission when adjacent Kelly AFB closed in 2001. The two-mile-long runway is now a joint-use facility between Lackland AFB and Port San Antonio. The portion of the former Kelly AFB still under USAF control is now known as Lackland AFB/Kelly Field Annex and its permanently based flying units include the Air Force Reserve Command's (AFRC) 433d Airlift Wing, an Air Mobility Command (AMC)-gained unit flying the C-5 Galaxy and the 149th Fighter Wing of the Texas Air National Guard, an AETC-gained unit flying the F-16 Fighting Falcon. The civilian side of the former Kelly AFB is now known as Port San Antonio and hosts numerous major DoD defense contractors such as Boeing and Lockheed Martin, many of which directly or indirectly support major overhaul and repair of military aircraft previously conducted, and in facilities previously occupied, by the Air Force's former San Antonio Air Logistics Center (SA-ALC) when Kelly was an active Air Force Logistics Command (AFLC) and Air Force Materiel Command (AFMC) installation.

In addition, with the closure of Kelly AFB, Lackland gained the section of base known as Security Hill. Security Hill is home to numerous units such as Air Combat Command's 24th Air Force and 67th Network Warfare Wing and the Air Force Intelligence, Surveillance and Reconnaissance Agency. All units on Security Hill are considered tenant units.

Lackland now consists of the Kelly airstrip, Security Hill, main base Lackland, and the old Medina officer training base now named Medina/Lackland Training Annex. With the exception of a few buildings most of the old Kelly air base including the housing has been turned over to civilian jurisdiction.

On 15 May 2009, USAF officials announced that Lackland is the preferred alternative location for the 24th Air Force.

In winter of 2009 it was decided to combine all the military bases in San Antonio into one large base named Joint Base San Antonio.

In April 2012 Lackland served as an overflow shelter for an influx of illegal immigrant minors after the Administration for Children and Families determined that all other local shelters were filled to capacity.

On 28 October 2013, the Military Working Dog Teams National Monument was unveiled during a dedication ceremony with full military fanfare. The U.S. National Monument was authorized with the passage of Public Law 110–181, Section 2877, (having been introduced to Congress by Rep. Walter B. Jones) which was passed by the United States Congress and signed into law by President George W. Bush. The monument was built next to the Basic Military Training Parade Field, that location being chosen due to the historical significance of the base as the training center and headquarters of the United States Department of Defense Military Working Dog Program.

Sexual assault scandal
In the United States Air Force Basic Training scandal, involving sexual assault on the base, dozens of female and male recruits said that they were sexually harassed or raped by their instructors from 2010 onward.

2016 shooting
On 8 April 2016, an airman on the base shot and killed a squadron commander, then killed himself.

Kelly Field Renaming
In December 2017, Lackland AFB renamed Kelly Field Annex to Kelly Field to commemorate the 100 year anniversary of the airfield becoming property of the US Government and to better fit its joint nature

Chapman Training Annex Renaming
On March 4, 2020, Medina Training Annex was renamed to Chapman Training Annex after Medal of Honor recipient Master Sgt. John A. Chapman

Census information

The U.S. Census Bureau counts the base as a census-designated place (Lackland AFB CDP) with a population at the 2020 census of 9,467.

See also

 433rd Security Forces Squadron
 Texas Cryptology Center
 Texas World War II Army Airfields
 Air Training Command
 Twenty-Fourth Air Force
 United States general surveillance radar stations

References

External links

 Lackland AFB official site
 Lackland AFB Personnel Locator
 USAF: A Narrative History of Lackland Air Force Base
 
 USAF BMT Flight Photograph Project
 802nd Force Support Squadron (formerly Lackland Services) Website
 Unofficial website
 Lackland Air Force Base at LacklandAFB.com (Comprehensive Lackland AFB Directory)
 BRAC 2005: Closings, Realignments to Reshape Infrastructure
 Voices on Antisemitism Interview with Colonel Edward B. Westermann from the United States Holocaust Memorial Museum
 Military Working Dog Teams National Monument official site

Installations of the United States Air Force in Texas
Initial United States Air Force installations
USAF Air Training Command Installations
Census-designated places in Texas
Military installations in Texas
Radar stations of the United States Air Force
Aerospace Defense Command military installations
Buildings and structures in San Antonio
1941 establishments in Texas
Military airbases established in 1941
Joint Base San Antonio